Rafi Ali (born 11 December 1972) is a former Singaporean footballer and coach. He is part of the Singapore national football team that won the 1998 Tiger Cup. He started his career with Geylang United. His preferred playing position is either as sweeper or playmaker.

Rafi Ali is now working on the Rafi Ali Soccer School for kids.
He is also coaching Republic Polytechnic's Male football IG team.

On 27 April 2014, Rafi was appointed head coach of Tampines Rovers following the resignation of Salim Moin. He led the team as interim head coach until the end of the season.

Honours

Domestic
League
 S.League: 2
 2004, 2005

Cups
 Singapore Cup: 2
 2004, 2006

ASEAN competition
 ASEAN Club Championship: 1
 2005

International
Singapore
ASEAN Football Championship: 1998
Malaysia Premier League: 1994
Malaysia Cup: 1994

References

External links
https://web.archive.org/web/20101223090328/http://www.fas.org.sg/default.asp?V_DOC_ID=1065
Rafi Ali Soccer School

Singaporean footballers
Singapore international footballers
1972 births
Living people
Singapore FA players
Geylang International FC players
Tampines Rovers FC players
Tampines Rovers FC head coaches
Singaporean football managers
Singapore Premier League head coaches
Warriors FC players
Association football midfielders
Singapore Premier League players
Southeast Asian Games bronze medalists for Singapore
Southeast Asian Games medalists in football
Competitors at the 1993 Southeast Asian Games